Three ships of the French Navy have borne the name Artémise in honour of Queen Artemisia I of Caria:

 , a 32-gun 
 , a 60-gun frigate which took part in the Laplace affair in Honolulu.
 , a 28-gun corvette

See also
 
 
 

French Navy ship names